Home in WA is a local lifestyle show based in Perth. The show airs on Channel 7 Perth TVW

Home in WA shows a variety of products, builders, services and home furnishings, products and lifestyle ideas designed to assist people in Western Australia live well in their homes. The show is locally produced in Western Australia.

Background
Home in WA is Western Australia's only locally produced 'home products' television series. It is filmed and edited on a weekly basis. The show is telecast on metro Channel Seven Perth and statewide on Chanel Seven usually on Saturday or Sunday. Its usual slot is 4:30 pm.

Home in WA completed 685 episodes from inception in 2000 - 2022.

References

Seven Network original programming
Australian non-fiction television series
2000 Australian television series debuts
2010s Australian television series
Television shows set in Perth, Western Australia